Julie Rasmine Marie Laurberg (7 September 1856 – 29 June 1925) was an early Danish photographer who, together with Franziska Gad (1873–1921), ran a successful photography business in central Copenhagen.

Early life and education
Born in Grenå, Laurberg trained under the painter and photographer Leopold Hartmann before continuing her studies in Paris and Italy.

Career
In 1895, she opened her own studio in the new Magasin du Nord building in central Copenhagen where she worked with her former pupil Franziska Gad. From 1907, when Gad became an official partner in her business, the studio became widely recognized, attracting well-to-do personalities to have their portraits taken. One of her most notable portraits is that of opera singer Margrethe Lendrop which was widely published as a post-card engraving. Known as Julie L. & Gad, in 1910 the firm received the status of royal court photographer.

Laurberg's architectural photographs were also appreciated, in particular those of the new goodsyard and the hall in the City Hall building. Between 1908 and 1910, she also took photographs of Christian IX's Palace at Amalienborg, many of which have been preserved as large prints.

She died on 29 June 1925 and is buried in Assistens Cemetery.

Women's rights
Laurberg was also active in women's rights. She was a member of the Danish Women's Society (Dansk Kvindesamfund) and, in 1920, a founding member of the Women's Dwellings Association (Kvindernes Boligselskab). She also gave support to the role of women in photography which was becoming a popular profession for women at the time. Those working in her large photographic business were nearly all women.

References

External links

 Julie Laurberg, 1856-1925, atelier i Kbh. 1895-1925, fra 1907 m. Franzisca Gad

1856 births
1925 deaths
Danish feminists
Danish women photographers
Photographers from Copenhagen
Portrait photographers
19th-century Danish photographers
19th-century Danish businesspeople
People from Norddjurs Municipality
Burials at Assistens Cemetery (Copenhagen)
19th-century women photographers